Eleutherornis cotei is a medium-sized (estimated to be 1.5 meters tall) extinct flightless predatory bird, in the family Phorusrhacidae or "terror birds" whose remains have been found in Middle Eocene aged strata from France and Switzerland.

Discovery 
The partial remains of this bird were discovered in France near Listeu, a municipality of the metropolis of Lyon and Switzerland in Egerkingen in the canton of Solothurn. They were reviewed and described in 2013 by Delphine Angst and his colleagues under the name of Eleutherornnis.

Description 
It is a medium-sized phorusrhacid, with a height of about 1.50 meters that shows a combination of basal and derivative characters. Tarchlea of tarsometatarsus II is enlarged in its middle part as in psilopterines, while the pre-acetabulary of the ilium is more compressed laterally and more ventilated with neural spines of the synsacral vertebrae than in psilopterines, and thus recalls more the more evolved phorusrchacids.

Geography 
It is the only known phorusrhacid in Europe and one of the few species of this family identified outside the Americas, although Lavocatavis described in 2011 from Algeria, but whose membership of this family is debated.

References

Extinct flightless birds
Eocene birds
Phorusrhacidae
Eocene birds of Europe